Sherborne may refer to

Places
Sherborne, a town in Dorset, England
Sherborne, Gloucestershire, England
Sherborne St John, Hampshire, England
Sherborne, Somerset, England

People
Andrew Sherborne (b.1961), English golfer
Robert Sherborne (d.1536), English bishop
Baron Sherborne, an extinct title in the British peerage

Other
Sherborne School, Dorset, England
Sherborne Sensors, a British manufacturer of precision measurement tools
HMS Sherborne (1763), a British naval ship

See also 
Sherborne House (disambiguation)
Sherbourne (disambiguation)
Sherborn (disambiguation)